The Riverbend Festival, also called Riverbend, is a well-known annual music festival in Chattanooga, Tennessee, which was started in June 1982 as a five-night festival. Over the years, the festival devolved into the three nights of its current run and presently ranks in the top 10 percent of all American festivals. Additionally, Riverbend has won several national awards from the International Festivals and Events Association, including 8 in 2007.  The attendance for Riverbend has grown over the years and there are now regularly over  650,000 people that come over the course of the festival from all over Tennessee, the Southeast, the United States, and other countries. Individual nights can see some 80,000 people in attendance. The festival was named for the bend in the Tennessee River on which Chattanooga was established.

More than a hundred acts, both well-known and new, converge each year to perform various kinds of music, including classic rock, country, urban, and bluegrass, as well as jam bands, on three stages set alongside the Tennessee River. Headline performers are featured nightly on the Coca-Cola Stage, a barge which has been converted into a full-size concert stage. The barge floats just off the shore against a large collection of amphitheater seats built into a hillside at the water's edge. Major local and national companies, such as Covista Communications, Unum, and Budweiser, sponsor other stages throughout the riverfront area.

Admission is given to people with special scannable wristbands, which can be purchased in southeast Tennessee and north Georgia in the weeks leading up to the festival for a discounted price or purchased at the gate for a regular price. Admission was previously given to people who had collectible Riverbend Pins. A wristband provides admission for either one night or every night of the festival except for the Bessie Smith Strut. Concessions are purchased using a token system and many street vendors set up food and souvenir stands.

2014 Headliners 
 Friday, June 6- Gary Allan
 Saturday, June 7- Widespread Panic
 Sunday, June 8- Buddy Guy
 Monday, June 9- The Bessie Smith Strut (blues/jazz along M.L. King Blvd downtown)
 Tuesday, June 10- TobyMac
 Wednesday, June 11- Boston
 Thursday, June 12- Justin Moore
 Friday, June 13- Joan Jett
 Saturday, June 14- Young the Giant

Notable past performers

2016
 .38 Special
 Salt-n-Pepa
 Brett Eldredge
 Thomas Rhett
 Heart
 REO Speedwagon
 Blood, Sweat, and Tears
 Chris Young
 Chris Lane
 Kane Brown

2015
 3 Doors Down
 Hunter Hayes
 Sam Hunt
 Martina McBride
 Merle Haggard
 Slick Rick
 Doug E. Fresh
 Little River Band
 War
 Gregg Allman
 Suzy Bogguss

2013
 Jake Owen
 CeeLo
 Brandy
 Newsboys
 Dierks Bentley
 Drake White/Lynyrd Skynyrd
 Hot Chelle Rae/Gavin DeGraw
 O.A.R.
 Florida Georgia Line

2012
 Eric Church
 Foreigner
 The Happy Together Tour
 Chris Tomlin
 The Band Perry
 Charlie Wilson
 Goo Goo Dolls
 Lauren Alaina

2011
 Huey Lewis & the News
 The Beach Boys
 The Machine with the Chattanooga Symphony Orchestra
 Casting Crowns
 Miranda Lambert
 Brian McKnight
 Alan Jackson
 Kellie Pickler

2010
 Sheryl Crow
 Alison Krauss & Union Station
 The Waybacks, John Cowan, and Joan Osborne
 Third Day
 Darius Rucker
 George Clinton and Parliament Funkadelic
 Billy Currington
 Charlie Daniels Band

2009
 Willie Nelson
 Train
 Three Dog Night
 Steven Curtis Chapman
 Commodores
 The B-52's
 Montgomery Gentry
 Little Richard

2008
 ZZ Top
 The Black Crowes
 MercyMe
 Little Big Town
 Rodney Atkins
 Josh Turner
 Bachman-Cummings Band
 Sheev Palpatine
 Anthony Hamilton
 Mark Farner (of Grand Funk Railroad)
 The Ohio Players
 America

2007
 The Alan Parsons Project
 The Avett Brothers
 Blake Shelton
 Craig Morgan
 Daughtry
 Earth, Wind & Fire
 Jars of Clay
 moe.
 Ricky Skaggs
 Steve Miller Band
 Vince Gill
 Col. Bruce Hampton & The Quark Alliance
 2007 also debuted Riverbend's first ever classical recital featuring pianist Ning An.

2006
 The Allman Brothers Band
 Kenny Rogers
 Los Lonely Boys
 Angie Stone
 Hank Williams, Jr.
 Sugarland
 Trisha Yearwood
 Audio Adrenaline
 The Derek Trucks Band
 Donna Jean Godchaux-MacKay (of The Grateful Dead)
 The Dempseys

2005
 Kid Rock
 Boyz II Men
 Michael McDonald
 Newsboys
 Cheap Trick
 Big and Rich
 Pat Benatar
 Apologetix
 Yoda
 Johnny Appleseed

2004
 LL Cool J
 Keith Urban
 Michelle Branch
 Michael W. Smith
 Styx
 Hayseed Dixie
 Randy Newman
 Little Big Town

2003
 Joe Cocker
 Martina McBride
 The Temptations
 Rebecca St. James
 Everclear
 New Edition
 John Michael Montgomery

2002
 Lynyrd Skynyrd
 Blues Traveler
 Lonestar
 Nickel Creek
 Art Garfunkel

2001
 Al Jarreau
 Rascal Flatts
 Collective Soul
 Carman
 Travis Tritt
 Ronald McDonald

Official site 
 Riverbend Festival Official Website

Other sites 
 Riverbend Adds Rock and Roll to Line-up
 Pollstar Concert Listing for Chattanooga, TN

References 
   

Economy of Chattanooga, Tennessee
Music festivals in Tennessee
Tourist attractions in Chattanooga, Tennessee
1982 establishments in Tennessee
Recurring events established in 1982